After the Show may refer to:

 "After the Show" (CSI), a 2003 episode of CSI: Crime Scene Investigation
 "After the Show" (song), a 1974 song by Kevin Ayers
 After the Show (film), a 1921 American silent film directed by William C. deMille

See also 
 The After Show